Medlow Bath (postcode: 2780) is an Australian small town located near the highest point of the Blue Mountains, between  and . At the 2016 census, Medlow Bath had a population of 611 people.

Description and history

Medlow Bath is set in a semi-rural area which includes fire-prone eucalypt forest, and has been subject to bushfire threats many times during its history.

The Hydro Majestic Hotel was developed by Sydney businessman, Mark Foy in the early years of the twentieth century and was the main economic activity in the area, until bushfires nearly destroyed the hotel in the summer of 2003.

There is an elaborate network of walking tracks, which were developed in the bushland between the hotel and the escarpment of the Megalong Valley. The tracks offer scope for many fine bushwalks and views of the Megalong Valley, but in more recent years have deteriorated due to lack of maintenance. Other tracks in the area include Bruce's Walk, an old track that was upgraded by bushwalkers and other volunteers in the 1980s. Bruce's Walk is located a few kilometres east of Medlow Bath, on the fringes of the Blue Mountains National Park, a huge park that is now a World Heritage Site.

Australia's first Prime Minister, Edmund Barton, died at the Hydro Majestic Hotel in 1920.

Medlow Bath was originally known as Brown's Siding when it gave its name to a railway siding in 1880 because Brown's Sawmill was the main business in the area. In 1883, the town was renamed Medlow because there was another Brown's Siding near Lithgow.

Heritage listings
Medlow Bath has a number of heritage-listed sites, including:
 Blue Mountains National Park: Blue Mountains walking tracks
 Beauchamp Road: Medlow Dam
 Great Western Highway: Medlow Bath railway station

Population
72.9% of people were born in Australia and 85.0% of people spoke only English at home. The most common responses for religion were No Religion 39.6%, Catholic 19.1% and Anglican 11.0%.

Transport

Medlow Bath was connected to the Main Western railway line in 1880, when the station was called Brown's Siding. Medlow Bath railway station is now served by the Blue Mountains Line.

The Great Western Highway is the main road access route.

Katoomba Airfield, now disused except in emergency situations, is also located a few kilometres east of Medlow Bath.

References

External links

Towns in New South Wales
Suburbs of the City of Blue Mountains